The Başkent Yıldızları S.K., abbreviated form of Başkent Yıldızları Buz Pateni ve Buz Hokeyi Spor Kulübü, is a sports club founded in 1988 in Ankara, Turkey with a professional men's and a women's ice hockey team. The men participate in the Turkish Hockey Super Lig (TBHSL) and the women participate in the Turkish Ice Hockey Women's League. Both teams play out of the Ankara Ice Palace.

Başkent Yıldızları is Turkish for "Capital City Stars".

History
For the 2008–09 season, the team finished third out of the six team league. Başkent Yıldızları lost in the semi-finals to the eventual champions Polis Akademisi.

The 2010–11 season was shortened to a round robin playoff format. Başkent ıldızları was the only team to field a full import roster, they easily won the 2010–11 Turkish Super League Championship.

Men's team

Men's 2009-2010 schedule and results 
2009-2010 regular season results

2010 playoffs

Men’s roster (2012-2013)

Men’s roster (2009-2010)

Women's team

Women's 2009-2010 schedule and results

Women’s roster (2009-2010)

Legend:
C Captain

References

Ice hockey teams in Turkey
Turkish Ice Hockey Super League teams
Sports teams in Ankara
Ice hockey clubs established in 1998
1998 establishments in Turkey
Turkish Ice Hockey Women's League teams